The Hippo air roller, or Hippo roller, is a device used to carry clean water more easily and efficiently than traditional methods, particularly in the developing world and rural areas. It consists of a barrel-shaped container which holds the water and can roll along the ground, and a handle attached to the axis of the barrel. Currently deployed in rural Africa, its simple and purpose-built nature makes it an example of appropriate technology. The rollers cost around $125 each and they are mainly distributed by NGOs.

Physical design 
The drum of the Hippo water roller is made from UV stabilized linear low-density polyethylene and is designed to cope with the rough surfaces found in rural areas. The drum's volume is 90 liters (about 24 gallons). It has a large opening (135 mm / 5.3 inch diameter) for easy filling and cleaning. The size of the opening was originally determined by the availability of a large enough lid. The lid then on its part determined the roll radius of the roller, since enough clearance was required with the lid fitted to keep the latter clear from the ground and any obstacles which might damage it. The lid was eventually further recessed on later models to enhance its protection.

The steel handle allows the roller to be pushed or pulled over difficult and very rough terrain. The overall width of the roller with handle attached was determined by measuring the average width of a standard doorway and sized to allow it to be pulled through freely. This parameter together with the roll radius and the rounded shoulders eventually determined the average volume of 90 liters. The steel handle is fitted with special polymer end-caps to reduce friction and wear and prolong the life of the pivot cavities in the drum.

During development a water filled roller was drawn behind a vehicle over a dirt road at 20 km/h for 15 km without any significant signs of wear on both the roller outer surface or pivot cavities.

The roller is rounded at the shoulders to simplify tilting when wanting to pour from the full roller. However, the roller is also very stable in the upright position when it rests on a small, flat surface. The roller has hand grips at the bottom and top to make emptying the container easier.

History 
The barrel, originally called "Aqua Roller", was the brainchild of two engineers of South Africa, Pettie Petzer and Johan Jonker. Both men were inspired by the impact of water crisis in a rural environment.

Petzer and Jonker were recognized for their work on the Hippo Roller in 1997 with the "Design for Development Award" by the South African Bureau of Standards and its Design Institute.

Former South African President, Nelson Mandela, expressed his support for the Hippo roller, believing it "will positively change the lives of millions of our fellow South Africans".

Claimed benefits 
It is claimed that approximately five times the amount of water can be transported in less time with far less effort than the traditional method of carrying 20 liters (approximately 5 gallons) on the head.

Claimed benefits include:

 time savings (fetching water can be very time consuming in some poor rural environments);
 reduced effort;
 reduced strain (carrying heavy weights on the head every day for years puts strain on the body, particularly the vertebral column);
 increased water availability, with benefits for health and perhaps even enabling vegetables to be grown ;
 hygienic storage due to the sealed lid on the roller.

Use 
Although the Hippo roller was mainly designed as a water gathering aid for underprivileged communities, several other uses have since been discovered. Because of the Hippo water roller's water tightness it can act as a watertight container to keep valuables and clothes dry when going downstream in white water rapids on extreme excursions.

It can also suffice as a container to be dropped with life saving contents from helicopters or low flying fixed-wing aircraft in flooded disaster areas. This might include food and medical supplies, warm dry clothing and blankets, and naturally, water. The polyethylene is lighter than water and will stay only partly submerged, even with fresh water in it. In fact, some rollers have been distributed pre-filled with grain or other foodstuff to villages.

One of the draw-backs of the distribution of the rollers is that the rollers cannot be stacked efficiently to save space; thus transport capacity is wasted.

Administration 
Infotech, an information technology company, initially sponsored the project as a social responsibility project known as the Hippo Water Roller Trust Fund. Currently, the project is supported financially by donor funding which comes from individuals, corporate businesses and non-profit organization partners. Hippo Water International is a non-governmental organization in the United States created to raise funds there.

Deployment 
Around 46,000 Hippo rollers have been manufactured and distributed so far.

As part of the investigation into the alleviation of poverty and scarcity of water in the far northern parts of Namibia, the Social Sciences Division of the Multi-Disciplinary Research Centre at the University of Namibia, sponsored by UNICEF's Directorate of Rural Development bought 1000 rollers and distributed them into the community. Six months after the introduction they launched an evaluation on the success and performance of the rollers as well as the social impact of the roller on the lives of the recipients.

See also 
 Water crisis
 Rural development

References

External links
Official site

Appropriate technology
Water supply
South African inventions